Child class may refer to:
Subclass (computer science)
Child-Pugh score